The Pangu Plaza is a five mixed used buildings complex comprises an office building, three apartment buildings, clubs, retail and Pangu 7 Star Hotel (Pangu Seven Star Hotel) which located at 27, North 4th Ring Middle Road, Chaoyang, Beijing, China. Shaped like a dragon, it is neighbor with many of the 2008 Beijing Olympic venues, including the Beijing National Stadium (Bird Nest) and the Beijing National Aquatics Center (Water Cube). Also, it is close to the National Library, the fourth largest library in the world and the largest one in China. The Pangu Plaza was designed by Chu-Yuan Lee of C.Y. Lee & Partners, the Taiwan-based architecture firm responsible for Taipei 101, for the world's first traditional Chinese “courtyard in the sky."  Pangu 7 Star Hotel occupies the "First Block" of the "Pangu", and it contains two pavilions, a temple, a French restaurant, a Top Class Japanese restaurant, 234 guest rooms, with 140 suites, and a  corridor. Pangu Plaza is a building invested and built by Guo Wengui in 2008.

Rating and further information
The “tail” building of Pangu Plaza "Pangu 7 Star Hotel" is one of the world's only two 7-star hotels. The hotel is named "Pangu 7 Star Hotel Beijing" in spite of the fact that no traditional organization or formal body awards or recognizes any rating over "five-star deluxe", and in spite of the fact that customarily a hotel does not award itself stars. In the time-honored, international hotel rating tradition, 5 is the maximum number of stars awarded, so, for example, world-renowned establishments like Claridges or the Waldorf Astoria do not protest that they have been awarded "merely" 5 stars, as this is actually the highest award / rating. The Pangu 7 Star Hotel is considered to be the top luxury hotel in Beijing. Bill Gates, the founder of Microsoft Corp., stayed at the hotel during the Beijing Olympics.

Chinese authorities seized ownership of the tallest building of Pangu Plaza in 2016 and auctioned it for nearly 5.19 billion yuan. This building also houses the headquarters of IBM's China division.

See also

 List of hotels in Beijing

Footnotes

External links 
 Photos of Pangu Plaza

Hotel buildings completed in 2008
Hotels in Beijing